Northeast Community Credit Union Ballpark is a baseball stadium in Elizabethton, Tennessee.  

The venue is owned and subsidized by the City of Elizabethton and the stadium itself is primarily used for Appalachian League summer collegiate baseball as the home field of Elizabethton River Riders that will begin play in 2021. It was previously home to Minor League Baseball as the home field of the Appalachian League's Elizabethton Twins, the rookie affiliate team of the Minnesota Twins from 1974 to 2020. The Elizabethton High School baseball teams also use the Joe O'Brien Field.  

Built in 1974, the Joe O'Brien Field ballpark can provide seating for 2,000 people.

References

External links
 
 
 

Sports venues in Tennessee
Minor league baseball venues
Baseball venues in Tennessee
Buildings and structures in Carter County, Tennessee
Elizabethton, Tennessee
1974 establishments in Tennessee